Ján Fröhlich (born 2 December 1974 in Stará Ľubovňa) is a Slovak footballer who currently plays for FK Družstevník Plavnica.

Notes
 

Slovak footballers
GKS Bełchatów players
1. FC Tatran Prešov players
Sandecja Nowy Sącz players
Kolejarz Stróże players
1974 births
Living people
Expatriate footballers in Poland
Slovak expatriate sportspeople in Poland
Association football defenders
People from Stará Ľubovňa
Sportspeople from the Prešov Region
Slovak expatriate footballers